James Waterworth (1806 in St Helens, Lancashire – 1876) was an English Catholic missionary priest.

Life
James Waterworth was educated at Stonyhurst College and went subsequently to Montrouge to enter the novitiate of the Society of Jesus, in which he did not long continue. Sent by Bishop John Milner to study for the priesthood at the English College, Rome, he there devoted himself to theology, and especially patrology, often working sixteen hours a day. At the end of his course he was recalled to Oscott, where he was ordained, and where he taught theology from 1830 to 1833.

He then went to assist Rev. J. Yver at Newark, where he spent over forty years as a missionary priest, still continuing his studies of the Fathers. Within a year or two he was placed in sole charge of the mission.

He was made canon of Nottingham in 1852, doctor of divinity in 1860, and provost of that diocese in 1861.

He died in Old Hall, Newark-on-Trent on 28 March 1876.

Works

In 1834 he published a pamphlet defending Joseph Berington and John Kirk's work, The Faith of Catholics, against the attack of an Anglican clergyman called Pope; and twelve years later he published an enlarged edition in three volumes.

He also published a translation of the canons and decrees of the Council of Trent (1848) and of François Véron's Rule of Faith (1833). His Digest of the Penal Laws affecting Roman Catholics is another work.

His last book, England and Rome (1854), was on the relations of the popes to England. 
 «The canons and decrees of the sacred and oecumenical Council of Trent, celebrated under the sovereign pontiffs Paul III, Julius III and Pius IV» London : C. Dolman, 1848
Attribution

1806 births
1876 deaths
People educated at Stonyhurst College
19th-century English Roman Catholic priests